Trichilemmal carcinoma  is a cutaneous condition reported to arise on sun-exposed areas, most commonly the face and ears.

See also 
 Trichilemmoma
 Skin lesion

A similar tumor, although in the nail bed, is called onycholemmal.

References

External links 

Epidermal nevi, neoplasms, and cysts